Ankho is a rural locality (a selo) in Chankovsky Selsoviet, Botlikhsky District, Republic of Dagestan, Russia. The population was 35 as of 2010.

Geography 
Ankho is located 15 km north of Botlikh (the district's administrative centre) by road, on the Chankovskaya River. Khando is the nearest rural locality.

References 

Rural localities in Botlikhsky District